Airplane is the seventh studio album from Swedish "dansband" Arvingarna, released in 1998. The album was produced by Tony Visconti and was an attempt of promoting the band outside of Sweden.

Track listing
That was then, this is Now
If these Walls Could Talk
Every Heartbeat Says "I Love You"
Hold on to Your Heart
Eloise
Airplane
The Last Train Tonight
She Said
Funny How Love Can Be
One More Try
Tiny Goddess
Why oh Why
Together Forever
Eloise - party mix
If these Walls Could Talk - unplugged

References

1998 albums
Arvingarna albums